The Fundamentalism Project was an international scholarly investigation of conservative religious movements throughout the world, funded by the American Academy of Arts and Sciences. The project began in 1987, directed by Martin E. Marty and R. Scott Appleby, concluding in 1995. The understanding of fundamentalism framing the project was considered controversial in some cases, though even those scholars with criticism of the assumptions upon which the project was based admit that there is a great deal of useful empirical information to be found in the publications that grew out of the project.

Volumes
Volume 1: Fundamentalisms Observed, Marty/Appleby, (1991) 
Volume 2: Fundamentalisms and Society: Reclaiming the Sciences, the Family, and Education, Marty/Appleby/Hardacre/Mendelsohn, (1993) 
Volume 3: Fundamentalisms and the State: Remaking Polities, Economies, and Militance, Marty/Appleby/Garvey/Kuran, (1993) 
Volume 4: Accounting for Fundamentalisms: The Dynamic Character of Movements, Marty/Appleby/Ammerman/Frykenberg/Heilman/Piscatori, (1994) 
Volume 5: Fundamentalisms Comprehended, Marty/Appleby, (1995)

References

Marty, Martin E.  "Fundamentalism as a Social Phenomenon."  Bulletin of the American Academy of Arts and Sciences 42 (November 1988): 15-29.
Marty, Martin E.  "Fundamentalism Reborn: Faith and Fanaticism."  Saturday Review. May 1980, 37-42.
Marty, Martin E. "Too Bad We're So Relevant: The Fundamentalism Project Projected". The Bulletin of the American Academy of Arts and Sciences 49 (March 1996): 22-38.
Marty, Martin E.,  The Glory and the Power: The Fundamentalist Challenge to the Modern World. Boston: Beacon, 1992.

External links
 The Fundamentalism Project, University of Chicago Press

Religious fundamentalism